Lisa Teasley is an American Writer and Artist. Her first book, the story collection Glow in the Dark (2002) won the Gold Pen and Pacificus Foundation awards. Her second and third books, the novels Dive (2004) and Heat Signature (2006), address gender, race, intercultural and justice issues. She is the writer and presenter of the BBC television documentary “High School Prom” (2006). She is the Senior Editor, Fiction for the Los Angeles Review of Books. She lives in Los Angeles.

Early life and education 

Lisa Teasley was born and raised in Los Angeles, California, to Larkin Teasley and Violet Williams. Her father is African-American, her mother is Panamanian. Teasley studied English literature and Creative Writing at UCLA. She studied art on summer scholarship at Otis/Parsons. Her first job was a paid internship with the Los Angeles Times, and then she worked as a researcher for Forbes magazine.

Art 
Lisa Teasley is also a visual artist. As a painter, she has had a one-woman show at the Watts Towers Art Center, with John Outterbridge as director and curator. Her group shows include Brockman Gallery, the Los Angeles County Museum of Art's Rental & Sales Gallery, and the Pittsburgh Center for the Arts. Teasley was a member of the former art collective HowDoYouSayYaminAfrican?, aka the Yams, who debuted their first film at the 2014 Whitney Biennial.

Bibliography
 Glow in the Dark, Cloth, 2002, Cune Press
 Dive, Cloth, 2004, Bloomsbury
 Heat Signature, paperback, 2006 Bloomsbury
 Dive, paperback, 2006, Bloomsbury
 Glow in the Dark, paperback, 2006, Bloomsbury

Anthologies

Short Stories 
 Joyland, Retro Volume 1, No. 3, 2013
 Women on the Edge, Toby Press, 2005 
 Shaking the Tree, Norton, 2003
 Brown Sugar 4, published by Simon & Schuster, 2005
 Brown Sugar 3, Simon & Schuster, 2004
 Brown Sugar 1, Atria, 2001
 Step Into a World: A Global Anthology of the New Black Literature, Wiley, 2000
 In The Tradition: An Anthology of Young Black Writers, Harlem River Press, 2000

Essays 
 Because I Said So, HarperCollins, 2005
 An Ear to the Ground, Cune Press, 1997

Poetry 
 Beyond the Frontier, Black Classic Press, 2002

Awards and honors
 Gold Pen 2002
 Pacificus Foundation 2002

Literary Journals

Black Clock 

 Issue 5, Spring Summer 2006, “Modus Operandi”; 
 Issue 7, Spring Summer 2007 “Late Blooming; 
 Issue 10, Spring Summer 2009, “Joie de Vivre”; 
 Issue 12, Spring Summer 2010, “Beach Volleyball is Church”; 
 Issue 13, Fall/Winter 2010, “Mixed Tape” greatest hits issue “Joie de Vivre”; 
 Issue 21, Spring Summer 2016, “Bang” (The Elephant Talker)

Zyzzyva 

 Issue 99, 2013, “Full Circle”

References

External links
 Lisa Teasley Official site
 Review of Glow in the Dark in the Village Voice by Greg Tate
 Review of Dive in The New York Times Book Review by Jeff Turin

Living people
University of California, Los Angeles alumni
21st-century American women writers
Date of birth missing (living people)
Writers from Los Angeles
1964 births